Iraq competed at the 1968 Summer Olympics in Mexico City, Mexico. Three competitors, all men, took part in four events in three sports.

Cycling

One cyclist represented Iraq in 1968.

Individual road race
 George Artin — DNF (→ no ranking)

Weightlifting

Lightweight
 Zuhair Mansoor
 Press — 122.5 kg
 Snatch — 110.0 kg
 Jerk — 155.0 kg
 Total — 387.5 kg (→ 11th place)

Wrestling

Men's Greco-Roman featherweight (63 kg)
 Ismail Al Karaghouli
 Round 1 — fought Roman Rurua of the USSR
 Round 2 — DNS

Men's freestyle featherweight (63 kg)
 Ismail Al Karaghouli
 Round 1 — fought José García of Guatemala
 Round 2 — fought Todorov Enio of Bulgaria
 Round 3 — fought José Ramos of Cuba
 Round 4 — fought Jozsef Rusznyak of Hungary

References

External links
Official Olympic Reports
Part Three: Results

Nations at the 1968 Summer Olympics
1968
1968 in Iraqi sport